Luke Saville and Jordan Thompson were the defending champions but only Saville chose to defend his title, partnering Bradley Mousley. Saville successfully defended his title.

Mousley and Saville won the title after defeating Alex Bolt and Andrew Whittington 6–2, 6–1 in the final.

Seeds

Draw

References
 Main Draw

Launceston Tennis International - Men's Doubles